Kaveri Jha is an Indian model, film actress and air hostess, who works in Hindi and Telugu language films.

Early life
Jha was born in Bihar. Her family had to move a lot as her father is an Indian government employee. She went on to win the Ms Personality award on Miss India contest in 2005.

Career
After winning the award, she started modeling and appeared in a few music videos. She also hosted a TV show along with Sajid Khan.

After appearing in a small role in Priyadarshan's Bhool Bhulaiyaa (2007), she made her Hindi film debut in Hijack (2008), playing Shiney Ahuja's wife on screen. Thereafter she acted in a few Hindi movies, but it was Telugu films where she moved towards later on making her debut in 2008 with Nagaram, alongside Srikanth.

She juggles being an air hostess with Air India and her acting career simultaneously.

Filmography

References

External links
  Kaveri Jha Homepage
 

Living people
21st-century Indian actresses
Actresses in Telugu cinema
Actresses from Bihar
Indian beauty pageant winners
Indian women television presenters
Indian television presenters
Indian film actresses
Year of birth missing (living people)